Suzanne Pinckney Stetkevych (born 1950) is a scholar of classical Arabic poetry and the Sultan Qaboos bin Said Professor of Arabic and Islamic Studies at Georgetown University.

Biography
Suzanne Pinckney Stetkevych earned a BA in Art History from Wellesley College in 1972 and a PhD in Classical Arabic Literature from the University of Chicago in 1981. She taught Arabic literature at Indiana University, Bloomington, from 1986 to 2013, before taking a permanent position as Sultan Qaboos bin Said Professor of Arabic and Islamic studies at Georgetown University. The King Faisal Foundation awarded her the 2022 King Faisal Prize for her contributions to Arabic language and literature.

Works
 The Mute Immortals Speak: Pre-Islamic Poetry and the Poetics of Ritual
 Abū Tammām and the Poetics of the ʿAbbāsid Age
 The Poetics of Islamic Legitimacy: Myth, Gender

References

Georgetown University faculty
Living people
1950 births